A scorpion goddess is a goddess associated with a scorpion theme.

Examples include:

Ishara, Eblaite, Mesopotamian, Hurrian and Ugaritic goddess associated with love, oaths, illness and the underworld, represented by a scorpion symbol on kudurru
Ningirima, Mesopotamian goddess of incantations, was associated with the scorpion star
Chelamma, Hindu goddess of the Southern Karnataka region of India
Malinalxochitl, Aztec goddess of snakes, scorpions and insects
Hedetet, Egyptian scorpion goddess
Ta-Bitjet, Egyptian goddess with antivenomous secretions, consort to Horus
Serket, patron goddess of the Pharaohs and deification of the scorpion
Isis, Egyptian queen mother goddess who sometimes appeared as a scorpion, and was accompanied and guarded by seven minor scorpion deities on her travels
Lisin, also known as Negun, was a Sumerian goddess identified with the star α Scorpionis, the "heart of Scorpion"

See also 
 Snake goddess (disambiguation)

References 

Animal goddesses
Scorpions in culture